Brad McKay (born 26 March 1993) is a Scottish professional footballer who plays as a defender for Scottish League One club, Falkirk. McKay has previously played for Heart of Midlothian, St Johnstone and Inverness Caledonian Thistle, as well as Penicuik Athletic, Stenhousemuir and Dunfermline Athletic on loan.

Career

Heart of Midlothian
McKay grew up supporting Heart of Midlothian (Hearts) and joined the club from local side Edinburgh City in July 2010, aged 17. During the 2010–11 season he gained some experience on loan at junior side Penicuik Athletic, winning their Players' Player of the Year award.  McKay was included in the first team squad for the first time on 17 December 2011, when he was an unused substitute against Dunfermline. In May 2012, he signed a 12-month contract tying him to the club until at least the summer of 2013. In November McKay was loaned to Second Division side Stenhousemuir on a month's loan deal, he returned to Hearts after making four league appearances. In February 2013, McKay signed a further one-year extension committing him to the club until the summer of 2014. On 10 March 2013, McKay made his first team debut coming on as a 38th-minute substitute at Easter Road in a Scottish Premier League match against Hibernian, replacing the injured Fraser Mullen in a 0–0 draw.  Throughout the pre-season of 2014–15 season McKay was given the opportunity to captain his boyhood club by head coach Robbie Neilson when club captain Danny Wilson was not on the field. McKay played less frequently during the 2014–15 season, as he was unable to break a defensive partnership of Wilson and Alim Ozturk.

St Johnstone
In February 2015 it was announced that McKay had signed a pre-contract agreement with St Johnstone. He moved there as a free agent on a two-year contract in the summer of 2015. and made his league debut against his former side Hearts on 2 August, his mistake costing an early goal as St Johnstone lost 4–3.

After playing just 3 matches for the Saints, McKay was loaned out for the remainder of the season to Scottish League One side Dunfermline Athletic, primarily to provide cover for the recently injured Marc McAusland. McKay made his debut for the Pars in a Scottish Cup match against Scottish Premiership side Ross County. His first half challenge on Alex Schalk conceded a penalty which allowed the Staggies to take a 2–1 lead at half time. McKay redeemed himself however by scoring a header from a Michael Paton corner in the 56th minute, with the match finishing 2–2. McKay's contribution to the side helped Dunfermline to win the Scottish League One title, his second league title in as many years.

McKay returned to Perth at the end of his loan spell, however he was released by St Johnstone on 29 August 2016, after being deemed surplus to requirements by manager Tommy Wright.

Inverness Caledonian Thistle
On 31 August 2016, McKay signed for Inverness Caledonian Thistle on a two-year contract after being released by fellow Scottish Premiership side St Johnstone.

Falkirk 
On 28 May 2021, McKay agreed a move to League One outfit, Falkirk.

Career statistics

Honours

Club
Dunfermline Athletic
Scottish League One: 2015–16

Personal life
McKay is known by his nickname 'Angry Man', due to his dislike of losing.

References

External links

1993 births
Living people
Footballers from Edinburgh
Scottish footballers
Association football defenders
F.C. Edinburgh players
Heart of Midlothian F.C. players
Penicuik Athletic F.C. players
Stenhousemuir F.C. players
St Johnstone F.C. players
Dunfermline Athletic F.C. players
Scottish Premier League players
Scottish Football League players
Scottish Professional Football League players
Scotland under-21 international footballers
Inverness Caledonian Thistle F.C. players
Falkirk F.C. players